Glendalough is a suburb of Perth, Western Australia in the local government area of the City of Stirling, about 6 kilometres from Perth's central business district along the Mitchell Freeway. It was named after Glendalough in Ireland.

References

Suburbs of Perth, Western Australia
Suburbs in the City of Stirling